Layers of Love United is the third album from Norton. It was the band's first record with Pedro Afonso on lead vocals.

"Two Points" was a hit single and the song with most airplay on Antena 3 Radio Station during that year. 
The Japanese version of the album was released in June and has three acoustic bonus tracks. One of them is a version of "Paris", by the British band Friendly Fires. Layers of Love United was released on vinyl in 2012, in a limited edition, numbered and in white vinyl, which also includes "Paris" as a bonus track. In the same year the band released the EP Live Acoustic, which has six songs from Layers of Love United played live acoustically, in a showcase in Lisbon, Portugal.

Miguel Nicolau, Portuguese guitar player, plays as a guest musician on "Two Points", "Coastline" and "Layers".

The cover art was made by Bráulio Amado.

Track listing

References 

2011 albums
Norton (band) albums